Craugastor angelicus, commonly known as the angel robber frog, is a species of frog in the family Craugastoridae.
It is endemic to Costa Rica.
Its natural habitats are subtropical or tropical moist montane forests and rivers.

References

angelicus
Endemic fauna of Costa Rica
Amphibians described in 1975
Taxonomy articles created by Polbot